A breechblock (or breech block) is the part of the firearm action that closes the breech of a breech loading weapon (whether small arms or artillery) before or at the moment of firing.  It seals the breech and contains the pressure generated by the ignited propellant. Retracting the breechblock allows the chamber to be loaded with a cartridge.

Breechblocks are categorised by the type or design of the mechanism by which it is locked or closed for firing.  The firearm action more fully refers to the mechanism by which the operator actuates the opening and closing of the breech.

Variants

A way of closing the breech or chamber is an essential part of any breech-loading weapon or firearm. Perhaps the simplest way of achieving this is a break-action, in which the barrel, forestock and breech pivot on a hinge that joins the front assembly to the rear of the firearm, incorporating the rear of the breech, the butt and usually, the trigger mechanism. A breechblock is a separate component and is not a feature of the break-action. A breechblock must close against the rear of the breech for firing but be able to be retracted or otherwise moved for loading or unloading or to remove a spent cartridge.

A breechblock is not a component of designs with multiple or moveable chambers such as revolvers, harmonica guns, Kalthoff repeaters, Kammerlader rifles or, split breech designs.

This article primarily addresses the matter of breechblock design, as opposed to the action, which relates more with how the mechanism is operated, even if the distinction is not always clear.

Rotating bolt 
Usually referred to as a bolt rather than a breechblock, a rotating bolt is perhaps the most common variant. It is so called, because its operation is similar to a pad bolt or barrel bolt. The bolt slides in the receiver along the axis of the barrel and is rotated in the same axis to lock or unlock it against a closed breech. It is the basis for the bolt action, in which the bolt is rotated and retracted by a handle attached to the bolt. In some designs, the handle (sometimes called a cocking handle) rotates to lock against a shoulder in the receiver or body of the firearm. This type of locking is usually reserved for low-pressure applications such as the .22 cal rimfire series. More often, the bolt locks closed with two or more lugs that operate like a bayonet mount. Multiple lugs permit a smaller degree of rotation to lock and unlock the breech. Most types are front-locking and have the lugs mounted near the breech face. A notable exception is the rear-locking system used in the Lee–Enfield.

Rotating bolts can be adapted to automatic or semi-automatic designs and lever or pump actions. In these cases, the bolt is held by a bolt carrier. With the breech locked, an initial rearward movement of the bolt carrier causes the bolt to rotate and unlock. Similarly, when closing the breech, the final forward movement of the carrier causes the bolt to rotate and lock the breech. This action is commonly achieved by a slot cut in the carrier that engages a pin through the bolt perpendicular to the axis of the barrel. It is a type of linear cam.

Straight-pull bolt-action firearms do not require the operator to rotate the cocking handle to cycle the action. Some straight-pull designs may use a rotating bolt but other breech-locking mechanisms can be employed.

Sliding block 
The breechblock in a sliding block slides across the face of the breech to close it. The sliding action is perpendicular to the axis of the barrel. When the breechblock slides down to expose the breech, it is referred to as a falling-block, as used in the Sharps rifle. A sliding block is common in artillery. A vertical sliding block rises and falls while a horizontal sliding block slides to one side. It is a strong design. The breechblock is well supported by the receiver within which it slides and the mechanisms for opening and closing the breech do not have to act to any extent against the forces generated on firing.

Side-hinged breechblock 

A side hinged breechblock is used in the Snider-Enfield. Other firearms using this type of breechblock include the Warner carbine, the Joslyn rifle and the Tarpley carbine. The breechblock is hinged parallel to the axis of the barrel and swings away to the side to expose the breech. Firing force is contained by the rear of the breechblock bearing on the receiver.

Rotating drum

A rotating drum breechblock or rotary breech consists of a cylinder which rotates on an axis offset from the barrel.  It is also known as a cannon breech because of association with some cannon designs.  A longitudinal cut-out section or eccentric hole provides access to the breech.  Rotating the cylinder then closes the breech. The geometry is not unlike the cylinder of a revolver. In the M1867 Werndl–Holub, the cylindrical breechblock is retained at the rear by the receiver.  Mating faces can be profiled (ie not faced perpendicular to the axis of rotation) so that the breech tends to seal or fit more closely as it is closed.

the Nordenfelt eccentric screw breech is a variation of this design.  Instead of holding the breechblock between the breech at one end and the receiver at the other, in this design the breechblock is threaded around its circumference and is screwed into the breech until it meets the rear of the chamber.  The breech is opened by rotating it a fraction of a full turn, until a hole through the breechblock aligns with the bore.  The Magnum Research Lone Eagle pistol is a single-shot pistol chambered for rifle cartridges that also uses a rotating drum breechblock.

Trapdoor breechblock 

Commonly associated with the Springfield rifle, the breechblock is hinged above the breech face and lifts up like a trapdoor to expose the breech. The breech is locked by a catch operating at the end of the breechblock furthest from the hinge. It is similar in principle to a break-action.

Rolling-block 
A rolling-block can be described as a quadrant which is hinged below the breech. The quadrant rotates through approximately 90° to provide access to the breech or close the breech. In the closed position, a number of different devices can be used to lock the quadrant and prevent it from opening. In the Remington Rolling Block rifle most closely associated with this type of breechblock, the hammer also has a quadrant which cams behind the breechblock and locks it.

Peabody-Martini 
Initially used in the Peabody rifle, it saw more widespread use in the Martini–Henry and the subsequent Martini–Enfield. It employs a breechblock with a rear hinged falling block design, in which the breech is opened by permitting the front of the breechblock to drop down while pivoting on its hinge. Firing force is transmitted through the knuckle of the hinge and does not act directly on the hinge pin. The breechblock design as has been called a falling or tilting block but omitting the role of the hinge can lead to ambiguities. It is also used in the Krag–Petersson rifle.

Tilting block 

As a tilting breechblock closes on the breech, it is tilted up at the rear but it drops into a recess at the end of its forward travel - thus locking the breech closed. Firing forces are transmitted to the locking shoulder at the rear of the recess. To unlock the breech, a slide or carrier moving rearward uses a wedge or ramp-like arrangement acting on the sides of the breechblock to tilt it up at the rear and lift it clear of the locking shoulder. The breechblock is then pulled rearward by the slide or carrier to expose the breech. In the closed position. the slide or carrier can also help locate the breechblock in its locking recess. The carrier or slide can be operated by lever or pump actions or by gas, for automatic and semiautomatic fire.

A tilting breechblock design is not confined to a tilt relative to the horizontal plane with the breechblock locking against the bottom part of the receiver (as described above).  The FN Trombone uses a side locking design and the breechblock of the Bren gun locks against the top part of the receiver.

The M1895 Lee Navy is also of this type. The tilting action is achieved without a separate breechblock carrier but by the design of the cocking handle.  When unlocking the breechblock, the cocking handle initially acts as a crank with a cam, which acts against the receiver to lift the rear of the bolt out of the locking recess.  Further rearward pressure on the cocking handle then pulls the breechblock rearward.

In-line 
The breech is opened by the breechblock moving in-line with the axis of the barrel and is locked in the closed position by an obstruction such as a cam, wedge, pawl or levers. A roller lock is commonly associated with firearms produced by Heckler & Koch. This type of breechblock can be adapted to cycle by lever, cocking handle, gas or recoil. The mechanism is usually designed so that a single action unlocks and then withdraws the breechblock.

The Henry rifle and subsequent Winchester rifles use an arrangement of levers referred to as a toggle, similar in operation to locking pliers.  The breechblock is held closed when the two levers forming the toggle are in-line.

The Mannlicher M1886 rifle is locked with a single pawl on the underside of the bolt assembly. The cocking handle is separate from the bolt and acts much like a bolt carrier. When the cocking handle is pulled rearward, it first lifts the pawl before retracting the bolt rearward. This system was adapted to recoil operation by Berhnard Müller in his 1902 prototype pistol and has subsequently been used in other pistols such as the Walther P38. 

Flapper locking (as used in the Degtyaryov machine gun) uses metal plates (pawls) on either side of the breechblock that "flap out" like barbs on an arrow and lock into recesses in the receiver.  The flaps can be retracted parallel to the block for unlocking.

The straight-pull Heym SR 30 uses ball bearings for locking, similar to an air fitting connector.  The Blaser R93, another straight-pull action, is similar.  It has a locking collet that consists claw-like segments instead of ball bearings. The multiple claws provide a large contact area to distribute load.  These are arranged radially around the axis of the bolt.  They extend to lock the bolt by engaging with an annular groove in the barrel behind the chamber and are retracted to unlock the bolt.

Blowback 

Blowback actions use an in-line breechblock in which the breech is never locked and is held closed by spring tension alone. The force of the discharge is contained by a combination of spring force and the mass of the breechblock. They are used in semiautomatic and automatic firearms using low-powered cartridges. It is common in semiautomatic rifles and pistol chambered for .22 cal rimfire cartridges and many submachine guns. A variation is blow forward operation, in which the breechblock is fixed and the barrel moves. Delayed blowback uses additional mechanical devices that retard or delay the rearward movement of the breechblock; however, the breechblock is not locked in place by such devices. It allows a lighter mechanism compared with simple blowback.

Floating actions 
In most longarms, the barrel is firmly attached to the receiver and does not move relative to the receiver during operations. Most semiautomatic pistols firing the higher powered pistol cartridges use a locked-breech design. The action is manually cycled by moving the slide rearward. The slide contains the breechblock and is initially locked to the barrel so that the combined assembly move together. A short movement trips the mechanism to unlock the barrel from the slide assembly, allowing the breech to open. When fired, recoil results in the same action. In many instances, the barrel and breechblock remain in-line. In the Browning Hi-Power and Colt's M1911 pistol, the barrel is tilted slightly to release it from interlocking ribs, so in this respect, it may be likened to a tilting breechblock, even though it is the barrel and not the breechblock that tilts.

This type of floating configuration and recoil operation is not confined to pistols and may be found in machine guns and auto-firing cannons.

Interrupted screw 

Perhaps a variation on the rotating bolt, an interrupted screw provides greater strength than simple lugs while requiring only a partial rotation to release the breechblock. The Welin breechblock is such a design and is used on weapons with calibres from about 4 inches up to 16 inches or more.

The Ross rifle Mk III is a straight-pull design that has multi-thread locking lugs.

Falling screwed breechblock 
The Ferguson rifle used a tapered screw plug inserted perpendicular to the axis of the barrel. It was charged with ball and powder and required only one rotation to permit loading. While novel and effective, cost was a factor for its limited acceptance.

See also
:Category:Firearm actions

Notes

References

External links
 Breech Mechanisms in artillery

Firearm components
Firearm actions